Pawo Choyning Dorji (born 23 June 1983) is a Bhutanese filmmaker and photographer. His feature directorial debut Lunana: A Yak in the Classroom (2019) was nominated for Best International Feature Film at the 94th Academy Awards. He is the youngest recipient of Bhutan’s highest civilian award, the Druk Thuksey, the Heart Son of the Thunder Dragon. It was bestowed to him by King Jigme Khesar Namgyel Wangchuck on the December 17th, 2022, the 115th National Day of Bhutan. He is a member of the Academy of Motion Picture Arts and Sciences.

Early life and education
The son of a diplomat, Dorji was born in Darjeeling, India. He attended Kodaikanal International School during the time he lived in India and Yangchenphug Higher Secondary School back in Bhutan. He graduated with a degree in government and international relations from Lawrence University in the United States in 2006. He then completed a qualification in Buddhist philosophy at the Sarah Buddhist Institute in 2009.

Career
As a photographer, Dorji has contributed to publications such as VICE, Esquire, and Life. He has authored a number of photography essay books. His third book Light of the Moon was shot over the course of five years.

Dorji, a devout Buddhist, is a student of renowned Buddhist master and filmmaker Khyentse Norbu and discovered filmmaking through working with him, first as director's assistant on Vara: A Blessing (2013) and then as producer of Hema Hema (2016).

Dorji filmed his feature directorial debut over the course of two months at a remote school in the Himalayan village of Lunana. Lunana: A Yak in the Classroom had its world premiere at the 63rd BFI London Film Festival. The film won Audience Choice and Best of the Fest award at the 2020 Palm Springs International Film Festival. It was initially intended to be Bhutan's second submission for Best International Feature at the 93rd Academy Awards, but due to an error was resubmitted the following year, becoming Bhutan's first Oscar nomination. Dorji responded saying "The most magical part of this is it was so unexpected... I hope it inspires Bhutanese and Himalayan filmmakers."

Dorji was invited to become a member of the Academy of Motion Picture Arts and Sciences, having been invited to join the academy as part of both the Directors and Writers branch. He eventually joined the academy as part of the Directors branch.

On December 17, 2022, on the 115th National Day of Bhutan, Dorji was awarded the highest civilian award in Bhutan the Royal Order of Bhutan, the Druk Thuksey, the Heart Son of the Thunder Dragon, by King Jigme Khesar Namgyel Wangchuck. Dorji became the youngest recipient in the history of Bhutan and the first Bhutanese film maker to be awarded the Druk Thuksey.

Personal life
Dorji married Taiwanese actress and producer Fan Yuin "Stephanie" Lai, daughter of playwright Stan Lai, in 2009. They have a daughter and a son. The family split their time between Taiwan, Bhutan, and India.

Bibliography
 Seeing Sacred: Lights & Shadows Along the Path
 Turquoise Heart: Bhutanese remembers a Bhutanese (2017)
 The Light of the Moon: The Legacy of Xuanzang of Tang (2019)

Filmography

Honours
  :
 Royal Order of Bhutan Medal [Druk Thuksey] (17 December 2022).

References

External links

Living people
1983 births
Bhutanese expatriates in India
Bhutanese film directors
Lawrence University alumni
People from Darjeeling